Vichadero Airport  is an airstrip serving Vichadero, a small town in the Rivera Department of Uruguay.

The Vichadero non-directional beacon (Ident: VO) is located on the field.

See also

Transport in Uruguay
List of airports in Uruguay

References

External links
OpenStreetMap - Vichadero
OurAirports - Vichadero Airport

Airports in Uruguay
Buildings and structures in Rivera Department